This is a list of Billboard magazine's Top Hot 100 songs of 2006.

See also
2006 in music
List of Billboard Hot 100 number-one singles of 2006
List of Billboard Hot 100 top-ten singles in 2006

References

United States Hot 100 Year-end
Billboard charts